Dirk Vöpel (born 29 May 1971) is a German politician of the Social Democratic Party (SPD) who has been serving as a member of the Bundestag from the state of North Rhine-Westphalia since 2013, representing the Oberhausen – Wesel III district.

Political career 
Vöpel first became a member of the Bundestag in the 2013 German federal election. He has since been serving as a member of the Defense Committee.

In addition to his committee assignments, Vöpel has been part of the German delegation to the Parliamentary Assembly of the Organization for Security and Co-operation in Europe (OSCE) since 2018. From 2014 to 2017, he also served as deputy chair of the German-Slovak Parliamentary Friendship Group.

References

External links 

  
 Bundestag biography 

1971 births
Living people
Members of the Bundestag for North Rhine-Westphalia
Members of the Bundestag 2021–2025
Members of the Bundestag 2017–2021
Members of the Bundestag 2013–2017
Members of the Bundestag for the Social Democratic Party of Germany